Cerura liturata is a moth of the family Notodontidae described by Francis Walker in 1855. It is found from the Oriental tropics of India, Sri Lanka to Sundaland.

Description
It is a pure white moth. Palpi are black. Collar and thorax spotted with black. Abdomen may be banded or completely suffused with black, leaving a white patch with a black semicircular mark on the last abdominal segment. Forewings with two waved sub-basal lines from the costa to median nervure, some black spots below the median nervure. A highly waved antemedial band, three waved postmedial lines and a waved medial line present. There is a black line on discocellulars surrounded by a black ring mark. Hindwings are more or less suffused with fuscous. There are two indistinct medial lines and a series of marginal black spots.

The larvae feed on Flacourtiaceae, Populus and Terminalia species.

References

Notodontidae
Moths of Asia
Moths described in 1855